Dave van der Veen is a Dutch mixed martial artist. He competed in the Light Heavyweight and Heavyweight divisions. He was a Dutch Power lifting champion and Shootfighter in RINGS.

Mixed martial arts record

|-
| Loss
| align=center| 5-9
| Sander MacKilljan
| TKO (3 knock downs)
| 2H2H 4: Simply the Best 4
| 
| align=center| 0
| align=center| N/A
| Rotterdam, South Holland, Netherlands
| 
|-
| Loss
| align=center| 5-8
| Cheick Kongo
| TKO (punches)
| Rings Holland: Some Like It Hard
| 
| align=center| 2
| align=center| 1:25
| Utrecht, Utrecht,  Netherlands
| 
|-
| Loss
| align=center| 5-7
| Roman Zentsov
| TKO (punches)
| 2H2H 3: Hotter Than Hot
| 
| align=center| 1
| align=center| 2:15
| Rotterdam, South Holland, Netherlands
| 
|-
| Win
| align=center| 5-6
| Edmunds Kirsis
| DQ
| Rings Holland: No Guts, No Glory
| 
| align=center| 1
| align=center| 2:47
| Amsterdam, North Holland, Netherlands
| 
|-
| Loss
| align=center| 4-6
| Jerrel Venetiaan
| Decision (unanimous)
| Rings Holland: Di Capo Di Tutti Capi
| 
| align=center| 2
| align=center| 5:00
| Utrecht, Utrecht,  Netherlands
| 
|-
| Win
| align=center| 4-5
| Danny Rushton
| TKO (knee and palm strikes)
| Rings Holland: There Can Only Be One Champion
| 
| align=center| 2
| align=center| 2:21
| Utrecht, Utrecht,  Netherlands
| 
|-
| Loss
| align=center| 3-5
| Lee Hasdell
| Submission (armbar)
| TFKRG 5: Total Fight KRG 5
| 
| align=center| 1
| align=center| 1:47
| Buckinghamshire, England
| 
|-
| Loss
| align=center| 3-4
| Masayuki Naruse
| Submission (achilles lock)
| Rings: Rise 1st
| 
| align=center| 1
| align=center| 7:36
| Japan
| 
|-
| Loss
| align=center| 3-3
| Jerrel Venetiaan
| TKO (punches)
| Rings Holland: Judgement Day
| 
| align=center| 2
| align=center| 2:40
| Amsterdam, North Holland, Netherlands
| 
|-
| Loss
| align=center| 3-2
| Hiromitsu Kanehara
| Submission
| RINGS - Mega Battle Tournament 1998: First Round
| 
| align=center| 1
| align=center| 7:24
| Osaka, Japan
| 
|-
| Win
| align=center| 3-1
| Piet van Gammeren
| TKO (cut)
| Rings Holland: The Thialf Explosion
| 
| align=center| 0
| align=center| 0:00
| Heerenveen, Friesland, Netherlands
| 
|-
| Loss
| align=center| 2-1
| Lee Hasdell
| KO (palm strike)
| Rings Holland: Who's The Boss
| 
| align=center| 2
| align=center| 4:48
| Utrecht, Utrecht,  Netherlands
| 
|-
| Win
| align=center| 2-0
| Johan Buur
| Submission (rear naked choke)
| Rings Holland: The King of Rings
| 
| align=center| 1
| align=center| 1:54
| Amsterdam, North Holland, Netherlands
| 
|-
| Win
| align=center| 1-0
| Glen Brown
| TKO (Retired)
| U.T.F - Total Fight Night
| 
| align=center| 2
| align=center| N/A
| Milton Keynes, England
|

See also
List of male mixed martial artists

References

Dutch male mixed martial artists
Light heavyweight mixed martial artists
Heavyweight mixed martial artists
Living people
Place of birth missing (living people)
Year of birth missing (living people)